Henry Burnet Post (June 15, 1885 – February 9, 1914) was a first lieutenant in the US Army and a pioneer aviator who was killed in a crash.

He was the son of Colonel Henry Albertson Van Zo Post and Caroline Burnet McLean. On January 25, 1907, he married Grace Woodman Phillips (1887–1971). After his death, she married Francis Cogswell in 1916.

He served in the 25th infantry, and the 1st Aero Squadron. He died in San Diego, California in an air crash. He was buried in Section 3 of Arlington National Cemetery, near other early aviators and also near a number of American astronauts. Henry Post Army Airfield, the airfield at Fort Sill, Oklahoma, is named for him.

Selected coverage in the New York Times
 New York Times; February 9, 1914; page 1. Army flyer killed as machine breaks; Lieutenant Post Plunges to Death in San Diego Bay. Beachey Blames the Government. San Diego, California; February 9, 1914. Lieutenant Henry B. Post of the First Aero Corps, considered one of the most skillful United States Army aviators, plunged to his death in San Diego Bay today, when the right wing of his hydro-aeroplane crumpled. Lieut. Post died after establishing an American altitude record of 12,120 feet.

See also
 Aeronautical Division, U.S. Signal Corps
 Aviation Section, U.S. Signal Corps

References

1885 births
1914 deaths
Accidental deaths in California
American aviation record holders
Aviators killed in aviation accidents or incidents in the United States
Burials at Arlington National Cemetery
Henry
United States Army officers
Victims of aviation accidents or incidents in 1914